Sons and Daughters is a 2001 Argentine drama film directed by Marco Bechis. Two years after Olympic Garage, this is the second film of Bechis focused on the Argentina's Dirty War.

Plot

Cast
Carlos Echevarría as Javier Ramos
Julia Sarano as Rosa Ruggeri
Stefania Sandrelli as Victoria Ramos
Enrique Piñeyro as Raul Ramos
Antonella Costa as woman in labour

Awards
2002: David di Donatello for Best Supporting Actress to Stefania Sandrelli

References

External links

2001 films
Argentine drama films
Films directed by Marco Bechis
Dirty War films
2000s Argentine films